Alexei Vyacheslavovich Kovalev (born February 24, 1973) is a Russian professional ice hockey coach, executive and former professional player. He is currently serving as the assistant coach for HC Kunlun Red Star of the Kontinental Hockey League (KHL).

During his career, he played in over 1,300 National Hockey League (NHL) games over 18 seasons for the New York Rangers, Pittsburgh Penguins, Montreal Canadiens, Ottawa Senators, and Florida Panthers between 1992 and 2013. He was originally drafted by the Rangers and won a Stanley Cup with them in 1994.

Kovalev also played in the Kontinental Hockey League (KHL) with Atlant Moscow Oblast, and was last active with EHC Visp of Switzerland's National League B.

Playing career
Kovalev was drafted by the New York Rangers in the first round, 15th overall, of the 1991 NHL Entry Draft. He became the first Russian-born player to be drafted in the first round in the history of the NHL as well as the first Soviet player to be drafted in the first round. Best known for his stickhandling skills, deking ability and wrist shot, he became an important part of the Rangers' 1994 Stanley Cup run, finishing with the third-most points for New York in the 1994 playoffs. Kovalev, Alexander Karpovtsev, Sergei Nemchinov and Sergei Zubov were the first Russians to have their names engraved on the Stanley Cup. The Rangers' Stanley Cup win is well remembered in Europe because of the first Russian names on the Stanley Cup, as MSG Network broadcaster Al Trautwig said in his essay, Garden of Dreams.

During the 1994–95 NHL lockout, Kovalev returned to Russia to play for his hometown team Lada Togliatti, the defending International Hockey League champion from 1994. Kovalev scored eight goals and eight assists in 12 games. He also participated in Lada Togliatti's 30th anniversary game, and scored a hat-trick for the Lada veterans team.

Just 14 games into the 1998–99 season, on November 25, 1998, Kovalev was traded, along with Harry York, to the Pittsburgh Penguins in exchange for Petr Nedvěd, Sean Pronger and Chris Tamer. While only putting up 46 points in 63 games with the Penguins, he managed a strong effort with 12 points in 10 post-season games. In the next two seasons, he recorded two of his best seasons in the NHL with 76 and 95 points, respectively.

In a trade to mainly reduce their salary, Pittsburgh sent Kovalev back to the Rangers on February 10, 2003. He was sent, along with Dan LaCouture, Janne Laukkanen and Mike Wilson, for Mikael Samuelsson, Rico Fata, Joel Bouchard, Richard Lintner and cash.

On March 13, 2004, Kovalev was traded to the Montreal Canadiens for Jozef Balej and a second-round draft pick in the 2004 NHL Entry Draft. While only managing three points in 12 games in the regular season, Kovalev broke out in the 2004 playoffs, registering six goals and ten points in 11 games.

Kovalev spent the 2004–05 NHL lockout playing for Ak Bars Kazan, in the Russian Superleague (RSL), where he registered 23 points in 35 games. He then played for Russia at the 2005 World Championships in Austria, and was named the tournament's best forward.

As an unrestricted free agent, Kovalev opted to re-sign with Montreal on a four-year contract paying $4.5 million annually just prior to the start of the 2005–06 season, on August 3. He scored his 300th career goal and recorded his 700th point on December 20, 2005, against Dominik Hašek in a 4–3 win against the Ottawa Senators.

In 2006, Warrior signed Kovalev to endorse their hockey sticks. Warrior designed a custom shaft known as the AK27.

In 2007, Kovalev sparked controversy when he allegedly criticized his team, coaching staff and the Montreal media in an interview with a Russian reporter in his native language. Though the reporter who conducted the interview later rescinded Kovalev's quotes, and the tape she used never surfaced, a majority of the fans and members of the media believe the criticism to have actually happened. This story was especially controversial due to the poor performance by Kovalev in the 2006–07 season, amassing only 18 goals, 29 assists for a total of 47 points.

During the 2007–08 season, Kovalev found a resurgence playing alongside linemates Andrei Kostitsyn  and Tomáš Plekanec, recording a total of 35 goals, 49 assists for a total of 84 points in 82 games. As of the season's completion, he stood at the 94th spot of the top 100 all-time NHL scorers. Due to his inspired play, Kovalev was awarded the Canadiens' captaincy on two occasions during the season, replacing the injured Saku Koivu in his absence.

The following season, in 2008–09, Kovalev was named captain of the Eastern Conference at the 2009 NHL All-Star game in Montreal, and won Most Valuable Player honors as a result of his two goals, assist and game-winning shootout goal. Late in the season with the Canadiens, Kovalev scored his 100th goal with the club on March 31, 2009, against former teammate and Canadiens goaltender Cristobal Huet of the Chicago Blackhawks. At the end of the week, he was named the NHL's First Star for the Week ending April 5 after scoring two goals and seven assists, helping lead the Canadiens to three wins during that time.

On July 6, 2009, Kovalev signed a two-year, $10 million contract with the Ottawa Senators as an unrestricted free agent. On December 25, 2009, Kovalev was excluded from the main roster for the Russian team for the 2010 Winter Olympics, to the surprise of fellow countryman Evgeni Malkin (though he was selected as a reserve by Team Russia in case an injury occurred during the tournament). On January 3, 2010, Kovalev scored a career-high four goals in a 7–4 win against the Philadelphia Flyers.

On November 22, 2010, Kovalev netted his sixth goal of the season, scoring his 1,000th point in his career, notching the goal at exactly 10:00 of the first period against the Los Angeles Kings.

On February 24, 2011, his 38th birthday, Kovalev waived his no-trade clause to be traded back to the Pittsburgh Penguins in exchange for a conditional seventh-round draft pick. The pick would have been upgraded to the sixth round if the Penguins had reached the second round of the playoffs, which they did not. At the time of the trade, the Penguins were without 12 of their regular players, including Sidney Crosby and Evgeni Malkin.

Kovalev's return to Pittsburgh was brief, as General Manager Ray Shero announced on May 28, 2011, that he had no intention of re-signing the underachieving forward.

After failing to sign with an NHL team for the 2011–12 season, Kovalev returned to Russia to play with the Atlant Moscow Oblast in the Kontinental Hockey League (KHL). In June 2012, he was released from the two-year deal he signed with Atlant Moscow Oblast, at which point he declared his desire to return to the NHL. "Hopefully, I'll find an NHL team," Kovalev told the Montreal Gazette.

After the 2012–13 NHL lockout, Kovalev was given a tryout by the Florida Panthers, eventually signing a one-year contract with the team. "You could see how talented they are and they want to be in this League. All I want to do is help them. …I know I can match anyone in this locker room. I can still play this game," Kovalev said about the Panthers. In his first game as a Panther, Kovalev scored a goal and recorded two assists, one of the latter of which was an assist on teammate Jonathan Huberdeau's first career NHL goal.

On March 21, 2013, Kovalev officially announced his retirement from professional hockey. At that point, he had not played for the Panthers since a loss to the Pittsburgh Penguins on February 22.

However, Kovalev's retirement lasted less than three months. Swiss National League B (NLB) team EHC Visp announced on June 10, 2013, that they had signed him to a one-year contract with an option for a second year. He appeared in 44 regular season games, notching 22 goals and 30 assists for 52 points and winning Swiss NLB championship.

On July 3, 2014, Kovalev again announced his retirement from professional hockey at the age of 41.

On January 30, 2016, Kovalev revealed that he was yet again considering a return to professional ice hockey in the NHL. He referenced Jaromír Jágr, who is of similar age to him, as his reason to believe a comeback was possible. A team specifically mentioned was the Canadiens, however no team reached out to him.

Kovalev made a return to professional ice hockey on October 18, 2016, playing again for EHC Visp, the team he has become general manager of, after forward William Rapuzzi became injured before the day of the game. Kovalev gathered an assist on a goal by Jon Rheault, and finished the game with 14 penalty minutes, after receiving a game misconduct and being ejected from the game in the third period, for a hit from behind. Kovalev had been taking part in team practices since the beginning of the season.

Managing career
In March 2016, it was announced that Kovalev has signed with EHC Visp of the Swiss National League B to become general manager of the club.

Accomplishments 
First Russian/Soviet player to be drafted in the first round; 15th Overall, First Round, 1991
One of the first four Russian players (along with Alexander Karpovtsev, Sergei Nemchinov, and Sergei Zubov) to have his name engraved on the Stanley Cup;
First Russian player to be a captain of an All-Star Team;
Captain of the 2009 NHL Eastern Conference All-Star Team;
Most Valuable Player of the 2009 NHL All-Star Game;
November 23, 2010, recorded 1,000th (and 1,001st) career point(s) against the Los Angeles Kings, scoring a goal and an assist;
Most NHL games played by a player born and trained in the Soviet Union (1,302).

Personal Life
At the age of eight, Kovalev himself was diagnosed with a heart disorder that prevented him from playing hockey for two years while he underwent treatment.

Kovalev is a licensed aircraft pilot. He has a step sister Adel Bukary and a brother Maximilian Kovalev.

Charity Work
In October 2006, he unveiled the Kovy's Kids Suite at the Bell Centre to give children with heart conditions the opportunity to attend hockey games at the Bell Centre. In March 2008, Kovalev released a two-disc DVD titled My Hockey Tips and Training Methods. He donated 100 percent of the DVD sale profits to charities that promote cardiac care for children.

Career statistics

Regular season and playoffs

International

Awards and achievements

NHL
NHL All-Star Game – 2001, 2003, 2009
NHL Second All-Star Team – 2008
NHL All-Star Game MVP Award – 2009
The Hockey News – Saku Koivu Award (Comeback Player of the Year): 2008
Stanley Cup champion – 1994 (New York Rangers)
NHL's First Star of the Month – (February 2001)
NHL's First Star of the Week – (March 30–April 5, 2009)
NHL's Offensive Player of the Week – (November 6–12, 2000); (November 5–11, 2001).
Molson Cup Award (monthly) winner – November 2005, November 2007 to February 2008.
Molson Cup Award (season) winner – 2008

International
1992 Winter Olympics – Gold Medal (Ice Hockey)
2002 Winter Olympics – Bronze Medal (Ice Hockey)
2005 IIHF World Championship – Best Forward

Transactions
June 23, 1991 — New York Rangers first-round draft choice (15th overall) in the NHL Entry Draft.
November 25, 1998 — Traded by the New York Rangers, along with Harry York, to the Pittsburgh Penguins in exchange for Petr Nedvěd, Sean Pronger and Chris Tamer.
February 10, 2003 — Traded by the Pittsburgh Penguins, along with Mike Wilson, Janne Laukkanen and Dan LaCouture, to the New York Rangers in exchange for Joel Bouchard, Richard Lintner, Rico Fata, Mikael Samuelsson and a fourth-round draft pick.
March 2, 2004 — Traded by the New York Rangers to the Montreal Canadiens in exchange for Jozef Balej and Montreal's 2004 second-round draft choice.
July 6, 2009 — Signed a two-year $9.95 million deal with the Ottawa Senators.
February 24, 2011 — Traded by the Ottawa Senators to the Pittsburgh Penguins for Pittsburgh's conditional 7th round draft pick in the 2011 NHL Draft.
January 18, 2013 — Signed a one-year, $1 million (+300K signing bonus) contract with the Florida Panthers.

See also
List of NHL players with 1,000 games played
List of NHL players with 1000 points

References

External links

1973 births
Living people
Ak Bars Kazan players
Binghamton Rangers players
Florida Panthers players
Atlant Moscow Oblast players
HC Dynamo Moscow players
HC Lada Togliatti players
Ice hockey players at the 1992 Winter Olympics
Ice hockey players at the 2002 Winter Olympics
Ice hockey players at the 2006 Winter Olympics
Medalists at the 1992 Winter Olympics
Medalists at the 2002 Winter Olympics
Montreal Canadiens players
National Hockey League All-Stars
National Hockey League first-round draft picks
New York Rangers draft picks
New York Rangers players
Olympic bronze medalists for Russia
Olympic gold medalists for the Unified Team
Olympic ice hockey players of the Unified Team
Olympic ice hockey players of Russia
Olympic medalists in ice hockey
Ottawa Senators players
Sportspeople from Tolyatti
Pittsburgh Penguins players
Russian ice hockey right wingers
Soviet ice hockey right wingers
Stanley Cup champions
Russian expatriate sportspeople in the United States
Russian expatriate sportspeople in Canada
Russian expatriate sportspeople in Switzerland
Russian expatriate sportspeople in China
Russian expatriate ice hockey people
Expatriate ice hockey players in the United States
Expatriate ice hockey players in Canada
Expatriate ice hockey players in Switzerland